Adventures in Wild California is a documentary film showcasing the scenery and extreme sports found in California. It is narrated by Jimmy Smits and was released to IMAX theaters in 2000. The film is directed by Greg MacGillivray and features songs (including a cover of "Go Your Own Way") by musician Lindsey Buckingham.

California's geography and culture, which the film asserts inspires people to take chances, is the focus of the documentary. Extreme sports such as sky diving and surfing are captured with dramatic aerial and underwater photography, while examples such as Walt Disney's creation of an entertainment empire based on a "little mouse", the construction of the Golden Gate bridge during the Great Depression, and the establishment of high-tech Silicon Valley, showcase the risk-taking California inspires.

External links
 

2000 films
2000 short documentary films
American sports documentary films
IMAX short films
California culture
Short films directed by Greg MacGillivray
MacGillivray Freeman Films films
IMAX documentary films
Documentary films about California
2000s English-language films
2000s American films
American short documentary films